The PPP6R3 gene (also termed C11orf23, PP6R3, SAP190, SAPL, SAPLa, and SAPS3) is located at band 13.2 on the long (or "q") arm of chromosome 11 and is expressed in all tissues tested in humans. It encodes protein phosphatase 6 regulatory subunit 3 (PP6RS3). Also termed serine/threonine-protein phosphatase 6 regulatory subunit 3, PP6RS3 is the function-regulating subunit of protein phosphatase 6 (PPP6C). PPP6C is a component of a signaling pathway that regulates various cell functions including cell division, the repair of damaged DNA, inflammatory responses, messenger mRNA splicing, and the stability of chromosomes.

Two cases of nodular fasciitis have malignant tumors in which the neoplastic cells expressed a PPP6R3 gene merged to the USP6 (i.e. ubiquitin carboxyl-terminal hydrolase 6) gene to form an USP-PPP6R3 fusion gene. In both of these cases, the USP-PPP6R3 fusion genes was considered to contribute to these tumors malignancy.

References

External Links
 Atlas of Genetics

Genes
Genes on human chromosome 11